Inn District is a former administrative district in the canton of Graubünden, Switzerland. It was replaced with the Engiadina Bassa/Val Müstair Region on 1 January 2017 as part of a reorganization of the Canton.

It consisted of four Kreise (sub-districts) and seven municipalities:

Mergers and name changes
In 2009 Fuldera, Lü, Müstair, Santa Maria Val Müstair, Tschierv and Valchava merged to form the municipality of Val Müstair.
On 1 January 2013 the municipalities of Romosch and Tschlin merged to form the new municipality of Valsot.
On 1 January 2015 the former municipalities of Ardez, Guarda, Tarasp, Ftan and Sent merged into the municipality of Scuol.

Languages
Along with Surselva, the district of Inn is predominantly Romansh-speaking, with a large German-speaking minority. Except for the municipality of Samnaun, all of the municipalities of the district has both Romansh and German as their language, although the latter has an unofficial status in most of the municipalities.

References

Districts of Graubünden
Engadin